The 2021–22 season was the 89th season in the existence of FC Red Bull Salzburg and the club's 33rd consecutive season in the top flight of Austrian football. In addition to the domestic league, Salzburg participated in this season's editions of the Austrian Cup and the UEFA Champions League.

Players

First-team squad

Out on loan

Transfers

In

Loans in

Out

Loans out

Released

Pre-season and friendlies

Competitions

Overall record

Bundesliga

Regular stage

League table

Results summary

Results by round

Matches
The league fixtures were announced on 22 June 2021.

Championship round

League table

Results summary

Results by round

Matches

Austrian Cup

UEFA Champions League

Play-off round
The draw for the play-off round was held on 2 August 2021.

Group stage

The draw for the group stage was held on 26 August 2021.

Knockout phase

Round of 16
The draw for the round of 16 was held on 13 December 2021.

References

FC Red Bull Salzburg seasons
Red Bull Salzburg
Red Bull Salzburg
Austrian football championship-winning seasons